Yo Mama's Last Supper is a work of art, made in 1996 by Jamaican-American artist Renée Cox. It is a large photographic montage of five panels, each 31 inches square, depicting photographs of 11 black men, a white Judas and a naked black woman (the artist's self-portrait) posed in imitation of Leonardo da Vinci's 1490s painting The Last Supper. Cox is pictured naked and standing, with her arms reaching upwards, as Jesus.

In 2001, the piece was exhibited at the Brooklyn Museum of Art as part of an exhibition called Committed to the Image: Contemporary Black Photographers.  New York City Mayor Rudy Giuliani was offended by the work and called for the creation of a panel to create decency standards for all art shown at publicly funded museums in the city.  The work has also been included in other exhibitions about artistic depictions of The Last Supper, in locations such as the Aldrich Contemporary Art Museum in Ridgefield, Connecticut; Oratorio di San Ludovico, a 17th-century Catholic church in Venice, Italy; and a gallery in Jakarta, Indonesia.

Bibliography
 S. Brent Plate, Blasphemy: Art that Offends, Black Dog Publishing, London, 2006. 
 Francesca Bonazzoli, Michele Robecchi, Mona Lisa to Marge: How the World's Greatest Artworks Entered Popular Culture, Prestel, New York, 2014.

References

Color photographs
1996 works
1996 in art
Last Supper in art
1990s photographs
Black people in art